This is a list of cyclists who competed at the 2020 Summer Olympics in Tokyo, Japan. The cyclists competed in 22 cycling events in the disciplines: BMX, mountain biking, road cycling, and track cycling.

References

Cycling at the 2020 Summer Olympics
2020
Olympic, 2020}
Cyclists, 2020